Renegade Swords III is an anthology of fantasy short stories in the sword and sorcery subgenre, edited by D. M. Ritzlin. It was first published in trade paperback and ebook by DMR Books in March 2022.

Summary
The book collects six classic sword and sorcery stories and novellas that, "like the previous volumes in the series, ... have unfairly gone neglected or unnoticed," none of them having previously been reprinted since their original publication.

Contents
"A Ship of Monstrous Fortune" (from Strange Tales of Mystery and Terror no. 8, 2003) (Adrian Cole)
"Handar the Red" (from Tarzan Adventures, v. 7, nos. 40-42, Jan. 1958) (James Cawthorn)
"Magic's Price" (from Weird Tales, Winter 1989/1990) (Lars Walker)
"Quest of the Veil" (from Shanadu, 1953) (Gene DeWeese)
"The Fire-Born" (from Shanadu, 1953) (W. Paul Ganley)
"The Black Tower" (from Shanadu, 1953) (Brian McNaughton and Robert E. Briney)

Notes

2022 anthologies
American anthologies
Fantasy anthologies
DMR Books books